S. Senthilkumar (born 22 June 1977) is an Indian politician. He was elected to the Lok Sabha, lower house of the Parliament of India from Dharmapuri, Tamil Nadu in the 2019 Indian general election as member of the Dravida Munnetra Kazhagam.

Family and education 
He completed his MBBS from Annamalai University, Chidambaram in January 2002. Then he completed his MD (RD) from Sri Ramachandra Medical College and Research Institute, Sri Ramachandra University in June 2016. His grand father DN Vadivelu Gounder was congress MLA in 1965.

2019 Lok Sabha 
He contested in 2019 Lok Sabha election from Dharmapuri constituency and won with margin of 70,753 votes more than Pattali Makkal Katchi candidate Anbumani Ramadoss.

References 

India MPs 2019–present
Lok Sabha members from Tamil Nadu
Living people
Dravida Munnetra Kazhagam politicians
1977 births
People from Dharmapuri district
Medical doctors from Tamil Nadu
Indian radiologists